The College Widow  is a 1904 American comedic play by George Ade, which was adapted to film multiple times, and also into the popular 1917 musical Leave It to Jane.

Background

In the latter nineteenth and early twentieth centuries, the trope of a "college widow" was spoken of on college campuses, usually meaning an attractive unmarried woman near campus who would date college students, moving on to new students as the years passed.  Playwright George Ade first used the trope for a poem he wrote in 1900 (later published in the Saturday Evening Post in 1905), and as the inspiration for a play in 1904.

American football also drives the light plot of the play, loosely based on the football rivalry between DePauw University and Wabash College, which is now known as the Monon Bell rivalry.

Broadway production

After initial warm up performances at the Columbia Theater in Washington, D.C., the play successfully ran at the Garden Theatre on Broadway for 278 performances, from September 20, 1904, through May 13, 1905, and then toured the United States with three different touring companies.  The play was produced by Henry Wilson Savage and directed by George Marion.  At the end of the run and tour, Ade is said to have earned $2 million from the play.

In 1911, baseball star Ty Cobb starred in a touring production of the play.

Plot

The play is a cheerful and lightweight comedy.  Set at fictional Atwater College, Jane Witherspoon (played by Dorothy Tennant) is the daughter of the college president, and she works to prevent star football player Billy Bolton (Frederick Truesdell) from attending rival Bingham College.

Original Broadway Cast
 Frederick Truesdell as Billy Bolton, a half back
 George E. Bryant as Peter Witherspoon, A.M. Ph.D., President of the Atwater College
 Edwin Holt as Hiram Bolton, President of the K. and H. Road
 Dan Collyer as "Matty" McGowen, a trainer
 Stephen Mailey as Hon. Elam Hicks of Squantumville
 Edgar I. Davenport as Jack Larrabee, a football coach
 J. Beresford Hollis as Copernicus Talbot, a post-graduate tutor
 Thomas Delmar as "Silent" Murphy, centre rush
 Morgan Coman as "Stub" Talmadge, a busy undergraduate
 Robert Mackaye at Tom Pearson, right tackle
 E.Y. Backus as The Town Marshall
 Douglas J. Wood as Ollie Mitchell
 George F. Demarest as. Dick McAllister
 John H. Chapman as "Jimsey" Hopper
 Dorothy Tennant as Jane Witherspoon, the college widow
 Amy Ricard as Bessie Tanner, an athletic girl
 Gertrude Quinlan as Flora Wiggins, a prominent waitress
 Lida McMillan as Mrs. Primley Dalzelle, a professional chaperon
 Mary McGregor as Luella Chubbs
 Belle Nelson as Cora Jenks
 Lucy Cabeen as Bertha Tyson
 Georgia Cross as Sally Cameron
 Florence Cameron as Ruth Aiken
 Grace Quackenbush as Josephine Barclay

Adaptations and legacy
The play was adapted to a silent film of the same name in 1915, and again in 1927, and in the sound film Maybe It's Love in 1930 and Freshman Love in 1936.  The 1932 Marx Brothers' film Horse Feathers also largely appears to be a parody of the 1927 film.

It was also adapted into a successful musical in 1917 under the title Leave It to Jane.

References

External links

 

1904 plays
College football mass media
Broadway plays